Nowon District (Nowon-gu) is a residential district of Seoul, South Korea, located in the most northeastern part of the metropolitan city. It has the highest population density in Seoul, with 619,509 people living in the area of 35.44 km².

Characteristics
Nowon District was formed in 1988 by splitting from Dobong District. The sixteen administrative neighborhoods comprising Dobong-dong, Chang-dong, Wolgye-dong, Gongneung-dong, Hagye-dong, Junggye-dong, and Sanggye-dong became a part of the new Nowon District. The following year, Dobong-dong and Chang-dong were returned to Dobong District.

Nowon District (and Seoul) is bordered by the mountains Suraksan and Bukhansan, on the northeast.  The Jungnangcheon (or Jungnang Stream) flows through the western part of Nowon.

The Gyeongchun and Gyeongwon Lines of Korean National Railroad and the Seoul Metropolitan Subway lines four, six, and seven pass through Nowon District.

Nowon District is home to numerous educational institutes such as Kwangwoon University, Sahmyook University, the Korea Military Academy, Sejong Science High School, Seoul National University of Science and Technology, Induk University, and Seoul Women's University. The large number of schools, universities, and hagwon have given the "gu" the reputation of being the so-called "educational district" of northern Seoul, just like Gangnam and Seocho Districts of southern Seoul.

Kim Seong-hwan of the Democratic Party had been the mayor of the district from July 2010 to February 2018, when Kim resigned to run for the by-election of a National Assembly seat held in the district, which was vacated by Ahn Cheol-soo’s resignation. Kim’s bid was successful and the mayoral office is succeeded to Oh Seung-rok, also a member of Democratic Party.

In April 2013, multiplex cinema CGV Junggye opened in Junggye-dong.

Symbols 

 Tree: Ginkgo
 Bird: Eurasian collared dove
 Flower:  Korean Azalea
 Animal: Horse
 Grass: Reed

Administrative divisions

 Gongneung-dong (공릉동 孔陵洞) 1–2 (Both 1 and 3 administrative dongs are combined each other in January 2008)
 Hagye-dong (하계동 下溪洞) 1–2
 Junggye bon-dong (중계본동 中溪本洞)
 Junggye-dong (중계동 中溪本洞) 1–4
 Sanggye-dong (상계동 上溪洞) 1–10 (3 and 4 administrative dongs were combined in January 2008)
 Wolgye-dong (월계동 月溪洞) 1–3

Education

Schools and Universities in Nowon:
Korea Military Academy
Asia Pacific International School
Seoul National University of Science and Technology
Kwangwoon University
Sahmyook University
Seoul Women's University
Induk University
Korean Bible University

Transportation

Railroad
Korail
Seoul Subway Line 1 (Gyeongwon Line)
(Dobong-gu) ← Wolgye — Kwangwoon University — Seokgye → (Seongbuk-gu)

 Gyeongchun Line (Kwangwoon University)

Seoul Metro
Seoul Subway Line 4
Danggogae — Sanggye — Nowon → (Dobong-gu)
Seoul Subway Line 6
(Seongbuk-gu) ← Seokgye — Taereung — Hwarangdae → (Jungnang-gu)
Seoul Subway Line 7
(Dobong-gu) ← Suraksan — Madeul — Nowon — Junggye — Hagye — Gongneung — Taereung → (Jungnang-gu)

Sister cities
 Huaping, China
 Cairo, Egypt
 Milan, Italy

See also
Jungwook Hong

References

External links

Official website of the District Office of Nowon-gu 

 
1988 establishments in South Korea
Districts of Seoul